Ruwan Herath (born 5 August 1984) is a Sri Lankan cricketer. He made his first-class debut for Galle Cricket Club in the 2016–17 Premier League Tournament on 6 January 2017. He made his List A debut for Galle District in the 2016–17 Districts One Day Tournament on 26 March 2017.

References

External links
 

1984 births
Living people
Sri Lankan cricketers
Galle Cricket Club cricketers
Galle District cricketers
Sportspeople from Kurunegala